Hackberry is a town in Denton County, Texas, United States. The population was 2,973 in 2020.

Geography

Hackberry is located at  (33.150134, –96.918702).  It is neighbored by Frisco to the east and south, Little Elm to the north, and Lewisville Lake to the south and west.

It is served by the Little Elm Independent School District.

Climate

The Köppen Climate Classification subtype for this climate is "BSk" (Tropical and Subtropical Steppe Climate).

Demographics

As of the 2020 United States census, there were 2,973 people, 802 households, and 646 families residing in the town.

Education
It is in the Little Elm Independent School District.

Residents are zoned to Hackberry Elementary School. Since 2020, residents are zoned to Strike Middle School. Prior to 2020 residents were zoned to Lakeside Middle School. All LEISD residents are zoned to Little Elm High School.

The majority of Denton County, Hackberry included, is in the boundary of North Central Texas College.

References

Dallas–Fort Worth metroplex
Towns in Denton County, Texas
Towns in Texas